Francis G. Henry (1955 – 7 November 2022) was an Irish Gaelic footballer who played for the Shamrocks Gaels and St Mary's, Leixlip clubs, and at senior level for the Sligo county team.

Career
Henry played underage football with Knockalassa before winning a Sligo Vocational Schools SFC title with Coola Vocational School in 1969. He later joined the Shamrock Gaels club and won consecutive Sligo MFC titles in 1972 and 1973. Henry added a Sligo U21FC title to his collection in 1975 before claiming his first adult silverware when Shamrock Gaels won the inaugural Sligo IFC title in 1979.

Henry first appeared on the inter-county scene with Sligo as a member of the minor team. He was soon drafted onto the senior team and made his debut during the 1973–74 league. Henry was at left wing-forward when Sligo won their first Connacht SFC title in 47 years after a defeat of Mayo in the 1975 final replay. He continued to line out at inter-county level at various times until 1986, by which time he had joined the St. Mary's club in Leixlip.

Death
Henry died on 7 November 2022, at the age of 67.

Honours
Coola Vocational School
Sligo Vocational Schools Senior Football Championship: 1969

Shamrock Gaels
Sligo Intermediate Football Championship: 1979
Sligo Under-21 Football Championship: 1975
Sligo Minor Football Championship: 1972, 1973

Sligo
Connacht Senior Football Championship: 1975

References

1955 births
2022 deaths
Leixlip Gaelic footballers
Shamrock Gaels Gaelic footballers
Sligo inter-county Gaelic footballers